Fabrice Noël (born July 21, 1985 in Gressier) is a former Haitian footballer.

Career

Early life and career in Haiti
Noël grew up poor in the village of Gressier, 12 miles west of Port-au-Prince. He began playing soccer at a very young age, taught by his mother and brothers.  By the time he was 12 years old he was playing for the national team for 15-year-olds, and at the age of 16 he was one of the star players of Racing Club Haïtien, one of the country's most successful club teams.

However, his skills and success ultimately brought tragedy. In November 2002, while Noël was in South Carolina taking part in an international tournament, he received a phone call from his mother, telling him that his two older brothers Luckner and Kenson had been shot to death. Their murders are thought to have been carried out by supporters of a rival club that he had refused to join. Noël was granted political asylum in the United States, but his parents and youngest brother were forced to go into hiding.

After the ordeal, in late 2002, he went to live with a former coach in Palm Beach, Florida, and enrolled in Palm Beach Lakes High School. He joined the soccer team and quickly became the star, scoring 58 goals his senior season.

Colorado Rapids
Noël received many offers from colleges, but turned them all down, instead choosing to turn professional in order to raise the money to bring his family to the United States. While playing in a local tournament in February 2005, he caught the eye of Colorado Rapids head coach Fernando Clavijo, who offered him a contract after he graduated high school. On June 24, 2005, Noël signed with the Rapids; he made his debut less than a month later on July 20, against the San Jose Earthquakes, and scored his first goal in the season finale against Real Salt Lake.

Puerto Rico Islanders
During the 2007 MLS pre-season, the Rapids waived Noël, who subsequently signed with the Puerto Rico Islanders in the USL First Division. Noël scored the only goal in the two-legged 3rd place match in the CFU Club Championship 2007, enabling the Islanders to advance to the CONCACAF Champions League 2008–09.

Shanghai East Asia
In February 2010, Noël moved to China and signed a contract with Shanghai East Asia. On 4 April he made his league debut for Shanghai in the 2-0 victory over Guangdong Sunray Cave, replacing Jiang Zhipeng in the 55th minute.

San Antonio Scorpions
Noël returned to the United States in 2013, signing for the San Antonio Scorpions in the North American Soccer League. Upon his signing, Noël declared that "I feel very lucky to be a part of the Scorpions. We have a lot of good players and I cannot wait to help the team. I'm looking forward to it."

ATM FA
In 2014, it was announced that Noël had signed with ATM FA, a Malaysian club, for the 2014 Malaysia Super League Season. Noël was signed as a replacement for St-Vincent striker Marlon James who had retired from professional football.

Tampines Rovers
Following the appointment of V Sundramoorthy as head coach of S.League title contenders Tampines Rovers for the 2015 S.League Season, Sundram signed filled all 5 of Tampines' foreign players roster with foreigners formerly plying their trade in Malaysia. Utilising his intimate knowledge of Malaysian football, Sundram signed Noël after the latter was released by ATM FA.

Noël notched Tampines' first goal of the season, following a defensive mix up in the Albirex Niigata Singapore box, securing a 1-0 opening match victory for his new club.

Noël left the club after just 3 months at the club, citing personal reasons.

Kuantan FA
On 8 April 2015 Fabrice Noel join Malaysian side Kuantan FA.

Kuala Lumpur FA
On 16 June 2016 Fabrice Noel join Malaysian side Kuala Lumpur FA.

International
Noël made his debut for the Haiti national football team in an August 2006 friendly match against Guatemala. He was a Haiti squad member at the 2007 & 2009 Gold Cup Finals

Personal
With the help of the Colorado Rapids organization, Noël set up a fund, known as the Fabrice Noël Fund in order to raise money for his parents and brothers transport to the United States.

Honours

Club

Puerto Rico Islanders
USL First Division Championship
 Runners-up (1): 2008
Commissioner's Cup
 Winners (1): 2008
CFU Club Championship
 Runner-up (1): 2009

References

External links
 Puerto Rico Islanders bio
 MLS player profile
 Fabrice's story in St. Petersburg Times
 Fabrice Noël Fund
 

                   

1985 births
Living people
People from Ouest (department)
Colorado Rapids players
Puerto Rico Islanders players
Shanghai Port F.C. players
China League One players
San Antonio Scorpions players
ATM FA players
Expatriate soccer players in the United States
Expatriate footballers in Puerto Rico
Expatriate footballers in China
Expatriate footballers in Malaysia
Association football forwards
Haitian expatriate footballers
Haitian expatriate sportspeople in Malaysia
Haitian expatriate sportspeople in Singapore
Haitian expatriate sportspeople in the United States
Haitian footballers
Haiti international footballers
2007 CONCACAF Gold Cup players
2009 CONCACAF Gold Cup players
Haitian expatriate sportspeople in Puerto Rico
Ligue Haïtienne players
Major League Soccer players
USL First Division players
North American Soccer League players
Malaysia Super League players
Singapore Premier League players
Tampines Rovers FC players